Ryan Riback (born 19 September 1981), is an Australian DJ, record producer and remixer based in Caulfield, Victoria. Ryan Riback is most known for his remix of Australian pop artist, Starley's debut single "Call on Me" which exceeded triple platinum status in Australia, and platinum in the US.

Musical career

Ryan Riback started his music career by taking piano lessons as a child. At the age of 16, his uncle gave him a Roland MC-303 Groovebox. From there he began learning FL Studio and experimenting with other DAWs until settling on Ableton. In 2006 Ryan commissioned his first remix, "Soon" by Telmo. Since that time Ryan has become an in demand remixer, commissioning remixes for Starley, Maroon 5, Fifth Harmony, Andy Grammer, Terror Jr etc.

In January 2017 Ryan released his own version of "All That She Wants" via Cloud 9 Music. His debut single came shortly thereafter in June 2017 with the release of "One Last Time" featuring the vocals of Some Chick. The record was released via Ryan's label RBCK Records and licensed and signed to Spinnin', Kontor Records, Discowax, Liberator Records and BMG.

Discography

Singles

Remixes
 2010 Daft Punk – "Derezzed" (Ryan Riback's Tron Guy Remix)
 2016 Starley – "Call on Me" (Ryan Riback Remix)
 2016 Maroon 5 – "Don't Wanna Know" (Ryan Riback Remix)
 2016 Fifth Harmony – "That's My Girl" (Ryan Riback Remix)
 2016 Fergie – "Life Goes On" (Ryan Riback Remix)
 2016 Starley - "Call on Me" (Ryan Riback Remix)
 2017 Kelly Clarkson – "Love So Soft" (Ryan Riback Remix)
 2017 Lauv – "I Like Me Better" (Ryan Riback Remix)
 2017 JP Cooper – "She's on My Mind" (Ryan Riback Remix)
 2017 Jennifer Hudson – "Remember Me" (Ryan Riback Remix)
 2017 Clean Bandit – "Rockabye" (Ryan Riback Remix)
 2017 Andy Grammer – "Fresh Eyes" (Ryan Riback Remix)
 2017 LANY – "ILYSB" (Ryan Riback Remix)
 2017 Terror Jr – "Come First" (Ryan Riback Remix)
 2018 MKTO – "How Can I Forget" (Ryan Riback Remix)
 2018 Armin van Buuren featuring Josh Cumbee – "Sunny Days" (Ryan Riback Remix)
 2018 MIKA featuring Pharrell Williams – "Celebrate" (Ryan Riback Remix)
 2018 R3hab and Jocelyn Alice - "Radio Silence" (Ryan Riback Remix)
 2018 AJR featuring Rivers Cuomo - Sober Up (Ryan Riback Remix)
 2019 Walk the Moon - "Timebomb" (Ryan Riback Remix)
 2019 Against The Current - "Almost Forgot" (Ryan Riback Remix)
 2020 LittGloss - "L.A. Traffic" (Ryan Riback Remix)

References 

1981 births
Living people
South African dance musicians
Remixers
South African record producers
South African DJs
Electronic dance music DJs
South African emigrants to Australia
Musicians from Melbourne
People from Caulfield, Victoria
Musicians from Johannesburg